Tibetan Empire had nine high ministers in court. The highest one was gung lön chen po (lön chen for short), which could be translated into English as "Chief Minister" or "Prime minister".

The first Lönchen was appointed during Detrul Namshungtsen's reign. It was abolished before the Era of Fragmentation.

Here is a complete list of Lönchen according to The Old Tibetan Chronicle (P.T. 1287).

See also
List of emperors of Tibet
Banchenpo (Chief Monk)
Sikyong
Kashag

References
The Old Tibetan Chronicle
The Tibetan Annals

G
Great Ministers
Government of the Tibetan Empire